Intelsat V F-2, then named Intelsat 502, was a communications satellite operated by COMSAT. Launched in 1980, it was the first of fifteen Intelsat V satellites to be launched. The Intelsat V series was constructed by Ford Aerospace, based on the Intelsat V satellite bus. Intelsat V F-2 was part of an advanced series of satellites designed to provide greater telecommunications capacity for INTELSAT's global network.

Satellite 
The satellite was box-shaped, measuring 1.66 by 2.1 by 1.77 metres; solar arrays spanned 15.9 metres tip to tip. The arrays, supplemented by nickel-hydrogen batteries during an eclipse, provided 1800 watts of power at mission onset of its seven-year design life. The payload housed 21 C-band and 4 Ku-band transponders. It could accommodate 15,000 two-way voice circuits and two TV channels simultaneously. It had a launch mass of 1928 kg. In December 1992, the satellite enabled a direct link between United States and the Somalia. The satellite was deactivated on 14 April 1998.

Launch 
The satellite was successfully launched into space on 6 December 1980, at 23:31:00 UTC, by means of an Atlas SLV-3D Centaur-D1AR vehicle from the Cape Canaveral Air Force Station, Florida, United States.

References 

Spacecraft launched in 1980
Intelsat satellites
1980 in spaceflight